Beyond the Valley of 1984 is the second album by punk-metal band The Plasmatics.

After the success of their first album and tour, the band began recording their follow-up album, Beyond the Valley of 1984. After the amount of time and money that was put into their last album, Bruce Kirkland at Stiff Records agreed to put up the funds as long as Rod produced and the album was done in less than 3 weeks at a quarter of the cost of the first.

Producer and manager Rod Swenson proposed the name Beyond the Valley of 1984 and the 1981 tour became "The 1984 World Tour". In between touring drummers,  Alice Cooper's Neal Smith was brought in to do the drumming for the record, and the album, with its Orwellian and apocalyptic theme and songs such as "Masterplan", "Pig Is a Pig", and "Sex Junkie", were released a few months later.

The album was recorded at The Ranch in New York City, a studio owned by John Andrew "Andy" Parks, a singer-songwriter from Texas. A promotional tape exists with Andy doing the voice-over in an over-the-top Texan accent. The Ranch was equipped with a modified MCI JH-416 console, a 3M M-79 24-track and an Ampex ATR-102 1/4-inch two-track. Engineer Eddie Ciletti was brought in during the second phase to overdub guitars, vocals, electric chain saw and mix. Mixing was "unconventional," for a punk record due to rather "strict" parameters established by Rod. The record would not have any wide stereo panning, and it had to be mixed at a level low enough so that he could conduct business over the phone. The mix was done almost entirely on Auratone monitors.

During recording for the album, The Plasmatics were booked on the Tom Snyder late night TV show, where Tom Snyder introduced them as "possibly the greatest punk rock band in the entire world".

Beyond the Valley of 1984 would go on to spend 9 weeks on the Billboard 200 charts, peaking at 142 in the summer of 1981.

The album was re-released in 2000 by Plasmatics Media, Inc.

Track listing

Charts

Personnel
Wendy O. Williams - vocals, chainsaw
Wes Beech - rhythm guitars
Richie Stotts - lead guitars
Jean Beauvoir - bass, piano, synthesizers
Neal Smith - drums, percussion

Production
Produced by The Plasmatics & Rod Swenson
Mixed by Eddie Ciletti (also recorded overdubs)

References 

1981 albums
Plasmatics albums
Stiff Records albums